This page lists religious institutes of the Catholic Church that are now defunct. This refers to institutes that have merged, been suppressed, disbanded or died out.
 Merged refers to institutes who have either formed a new institute with another group, or joined another institute altogether.
 Suppressed refers to institutes who have been forcibly disbanded by an ecclesiastical or secular authority, usually for political or religious reasons.
 Disbanded refers to institutes who have decided to break up by the institute's own choice or authority, usually due to lack of numbers or a drastic change in circumstances or resources.
 Died out refers to institutes whose last living member has died.

The list given here includes not only examples of pontifical right institutes but also some that are only of diocesan right. It includes even some associations formed with a view to becoming religious institutes but were never canonically erected even on the diocesan level.

The list does not distinguish between institutes that historically would be classified either as "orders" or as "congregations."

List

References 
Specific

 Former Religious Orders, GCatholic.org

>